Sanaya Irani (born 17 September 1983) is an Indian actress. She is known for playing Gunjan in Miley Jab Hum Tum, Khushi in Iss Pyaar Ko Kya Naam Doon? and Parvati in Rangrasiya. In 2015, she participated in the eighth season of  Jhalak Dikhhla Jaa and emerged as the first runner up. She later participated  in Nach Baliye  in 2017 with her husband Mohit Sehgal and finished third place.

Early life and education
Irani was born on 17 September 1983 in Mumbai to an Irani (Zoroastrian) family.  Irani spent seven years in a boarding school in Ooty. She graduated from Sydenham College of Commerce and Economics, Mumbai and was pursuing an MBA degree before becoming a model.

Personal life

Irani announced her relationship with her Miley Jab Hum Tum co-star Mohit Sehgal on 19 November 2010, the last day of the shoot.

In December 2015, Irani got engaged to Sehgal. They tied the knot on 25 January 2016 in Goa.

Career

Modelling career and film debut (2005-2007)
Irani's first modelling portfolio was done by photographer-turned actor Boman Irani. Irani made her acting debut with a cameo in the Yash Raj Film Fanaa (2006) as Mehbooba . The actress spent the year doing TV advertisements with Bollywood stars like Shahrukh Khan, Kareena Kapoor and others before entering television. She made her debut with Jagjit Singh's Tumko Dekha. At the beginning of her career, Irani wasn't fluent in Hindi and spoke of her struggles with the language on several occasions.

Television debut and breakthrough (2007-2010)
Her television debut was in the SAB TV drama Left Right Left (2007) as Cadet Sameera Shroff. She was tutored by her director for her Hindi. This was followed by a negative role in Radhaa Ki Betiyaan Kuch Kar Dikhayengi (2008) on Imagine TV.

Irani's first lead role as a protagonist was in STAR One's Miley Jab Hum Tum (2008-2010), as the simple, studious and reclusive Gunjan. Irani briefly hosted the second season of Zara Nachke Dikha on STAR Plus with boyfriend Mohit Sehgal (2010). She was also seen as a panel member in Meethi Chorii No. 1 opposite Ragini Khanna (2010).

Established actress (2011-2014)
She portrayed the bubbly and loving Khushi Kumari Gupta, the female protagonist of Iss Pyaar Ko Kya Naam Doon? (2011-2012) opposite Barun Sobti. The show, which aired its final episode on 30 November 2012, had consistently maintained its position as one of the top ten daily dramas on Indian general entertainment channels.

In early 2013, Irani hosted Zee TV's Valentine's Day special Ishq Wala Love opposite Karan Grover. She later appeared as a contestant in Welcome - Baazi Mehmaan-Nawaazi ki (2013), hosted by Ram Kapoor.

She played the role of a vivacious and modern girl in Chhan Chhan (2013). The show was loosely based on the Hindi movie Khubsoorat. Irani then appeared in Rangrasiya (2014) as Parvati. The show was produced by Saurabh Tiwari, head of Tequila Shots Production. The story followed a border security personnel and an orphan girl who were ideologically different. It ended in September.

Jhalak Dikhhla Jaa and further success (2015-present)
Irani also participated in Jhalak Dikhhla Jaa 8 in 2015 which aired on Colors. Irani reprised her role of Khushi Kumari Gupta Singh Raizada again in its sequel mini series Iss Pyaar Ko Kya Naam Doon?... Ek Jashan (2015) which ended in December. In 2017, Irani participated in the dance show Nach Baliye 8 with her husband Mohit Sehgal. During Nach Baliye Sanaya & Mohit were in a controversy as fans of Divyanka Tripathi had claimed that they are the fixed winners but she lashed at the trollers on Instagram and said this is untrue.

Other appearances
In August 2013, Irani made a brief guest appearance in the dance show Jhalak Dikhhla Jaa to support her best friend Drashti Dhami. She made an appearance again in the seventh season of Jhalak Dikhhla Jaa to support Ashish Sharma in June 2014. In December 2013, Irani made a special guest appearance in Bigg Boss 7 in the grand finale along with Ashish Sharma, Preetika Rao and Harshad Arora. She also made special appearance in Beintehaa in March and June 2014.

Irani went on a U.K. tour on behalf of Star Plus.

Media image 
Eastern Eye placed her in their 50 Sexiest Asian Women list in 2012, She was again ranked 10th for the Eastern Eye newspaper. In 2014, she was listed in the top 10 best television actresses by Rediff.

Filmography

Films

Television

Special appearances

Web series

Music videos

Awards and nominations

See also
 List of Indian television actresses
 List of Hindi television actresses

References

External links

 
 
 

Living people
Indian television actresses
Actresses from Mumbai
Female models from Mumbai
Irani people
Indian soap opera actresses
Actresses in Hindi television
Indian female dancers
Dancers from Maharashtra
21st-century Indian actresses
1983 births